Mela Thiruvenkatanathapuram also known as Thirunankovil is a hamlet situated on the bank of river Thamirabarani. It is about 10 km from Tirunelveli, a district headquarters in Tamil Nadu, South India. There are 3 different routes from Tirunelveli to reach this place. The village is located on a hillock and the temple is located at an elevated plane surface. Even though these roads are narrow, they are navigable and every day mini bus service (Route No. 6A and 6B from Tirunelveli) is in operation which goes up to the temple entrance.

External links
 Mela Thiruvenkatanathapuram in Wikimapia
 Mela Thiruvenkatanathapuram in New York Times E.Sundar. Village. Farmer 
.

Tirunelveli
Villages in Tirunelveli district